The World Cup in Ski Orienteering is a series of ski-orienteering competitions organized by the International Orienteering Federation. The first official World Cup was held in 1989, then every second year up to 1999, and then in 2000, 2001, 2003, 2006, and 2007–2008.

World Cup overall results

Men

Women

References

See also
International Orienteering Federation (IOF)
Ski-orienteering
World Ski Orienteering Championships

Ski-orienteering competitions
Skiing world competitions
Ski orienteering